Thomas D. Rogers, Sr. (born 1945) is a former sculptor-engraver with the United States Mint and designer of several U.S. coins, including the 2000–2008 reverse side of the United States Golden dollar coins, or Sacagawea dollars. Rogers holds an A.A.S. degree with a major in commercial art.  He joined the U.S. Mint in October 1991, working at the Philadelphia Mint facility, and retired in 2001. As of 2003 he was residing in Long Beach, Washington,  and as of 2009 he was living and working in Oregon. His design for the Sacagawea dollar was modified slightly before it went into circulation.

Rogers designed the reverses of four of the State Quarters, including those for Maryland, Massachusetts and South Carolina.  He designed the original reverse of the American Platinum Eagle, which was used on the proof version of that coin's first year (1997) and on non-proof Platinum Eagles of all dates, and designed the reverses of two subsequent years of the proof version of the same coin, those of 1998 and 2001.

Additionally, Rogers designed the obverses of the 1996 silver $1 coin commemorating the 150th anniversary of the Smithsonian Institution and the 2000 Library of Congress $10 coin, and designed both sides of several other United States commemorative coins.

Although retired from the U.S. Mint, Rogers has subsequently carried out some design work for the Mint as an independent artist under contract. In 2014, Rogers designed the reverse of the 2016 Sacagawea dollar, which honors Native American code talkers from World Wars I and II.

References

1945 births
Living people
United States Mint engravers